La Matanie is a regional county municipality, located in the Bas-Saint-Laurent region of Quebec, in Canada. From January 1, 1982 to March 9, 2013, it was known as Matane.

The county seat is the city of Matane.

Subdivisions 
There are 12 subdivisions within the RCM:

Cities & Towns (1)
 Matane

Municipalities (7)
 Baie-des-Sables
 Grosses-Roches
 Les Méchins
 Sainte-Félicité
 Sainte-Paule
 Saint-René-de-Matane
 Saint-Ulric

Parishes (3)
 Saint-Adelme
 Saint-Jean-de-Cherbourg
 Saint-Léandre

Unorganized Territory (1)
 Rivière-Bonjour

Demographics

Population

Language

Personalities

 Isabelle Boulay, born 6 at Sainte-Félicité
 Yves Sirois, born at Matane
 Josélito Michaud, born in 1965 at Matane
 Alain Côté,  born may 3,1957 at Matane
 Claude Picher, born May 30, 1927  at Québec died in 1998 at Saint-Léandre

Transportation

Access Routes
Highways and numbered routes that run through the municipality, including external routes that start or finish at the county border:

Autoroutes
None

Principal Highways

Secondary Highways

External Routes
None

See also
 List of regional county municipalities and equivalent territories in Quebec

References

Regional county municipalities in Bas-Saint-Laurent
Census divisions of Quebec
Matane